The 2021 Abilene Christian Wildcats football team represented Abilene Christian University in the 2021 NCAA Division I FCS football season as a member of the Western Athletic Conference. The Wildcats were led by fifth-year head coach Adam Dorrel and played their home games at Anthony Field at Wildcat Stadium, Abilene, Texas. The Wildcats played their 100th season in 2021.

The Western Athletic Conference and ASUN Conference announced the formation of the WAC-ASUN Challenge (AQ7) for the 2021 season on February 23, 2021.  The Challenge included the four fully qualified Division I (FCS) members of the WAC (Abilene Christian, Lamar, Sam Houston, and Stephen F. Austin) and Central Arkansas, Eastern Kentucky, and Jacksonville State of the ASUN Conference.  The winner of the challenge received an auto-bid to the NCAA Division I FCS football playoffs.

Previous season

The Wildcats finished the 2020–21 season with a 1–5 overall record.

Preseason

Preseason polls

WAC Poll
The Western Athletic Conference coaches released their preseason poll on July 27, 2021. The Wildcats were picked to finish fifth in the conference.

 Note: Dixie State is not included since they are not playing a full WAC schedule due to previous non-conference game contracts.  Dixie State players are eligible for individual rewards.

AQ7 Poll
The AQ7 coaches also released their preseason poll on July 27, 2021. The Wildcats were picked to finish sixth in the ASUN-WAC Challenge.

Recruits

Transfers

Personnel

Roster

Coaching staff

Depth chart

Schedule

Game summaries

at SMU

Louisiana College

UT Permian Basin

at Lamar 

Statistics

Central Arkansas

at Eastern Kentucky

Lamar 

Statistics

at SFA

at Jacksonville State

Tarleton

No. 1 Sam Houston

References

Abilene Christian
Abilene Christian Wildcats football seasons
Abilene Christian Wildcats football